The diopter is an aperture sight component used to assist the aiming of devices, mainly firearms, airguns, and crossbows. It is found in particular as a rear sight element on rifles.

To obtain a usable sighting line the diopter has to have a complementing front sight element.

Diopter and globe sighting lines are commonly used in ISSF match rifle shooting events.

Diopter rear sight

The diopter is in principle a vertically and horizontally (elevation and windage) adjustable occluder with a small hole (aperture), and is placed close in front of the shooter's aiming eye. Through this small hole the shooter can view the front sight component(s) and the intended target.

The small diopter viewing opening ensures the shooter's eye is very precisely and consistently centered behind the diopter sight. The diopter sight is easy to use and usually allows for very accurate aiming, because a relative long sighting line can be used. A long sighting line helps to reduce eventual angle errors and will, in case the sight has an incremental adjustment mechanism, adjust in smaller increments when compared to a further identical shorter sighting line.

Principle 

Because of this optical effect the front sight will also appear more steady, even though the shooter moves the head in a way such that the sighting eye moves sideways relative to the rear sight. Also, the depth of field is increased so that both the sights and shooting target will appear sharp at the same time which further simplifies the aiming process.

The parallax distance of a diopter sight is effectively adjusted to be the same as the sight distance. However, since the diopter hole is small, the aiming eye will be relatively well centered, and the parallax error will be relatively small in practice. There will be almost no parallax error if the eye and front globe sight are near perfectly centered through the diopter. In comparison, the parallax error on aperture sights with larger openings can increase quickly if the eye is not well centered in the rear sight.

With larger aperture sights the shooter must make a conscious effort to center the eye in the rear sight for precise aiming. A true diopter sight (aperture below 1.2 mm) however has the advantage that the shooter does not have to concentrate on eye and rear sight alignment for precision aiming, and therefore the sighting process is reduced to only aligning the front sight to the target.

Aperture sights (both diopter and non-diopter) require being placed close to the aiming eye, while open sights have to be placed at least 30 cm away from the eye to in order to appear sharp.

Modern target sight setups 
Some ISSF (Olympic) shooting events require this precision level for sight adjustment since the score of the top competitors (last) shots series is expressed in 0.1s of scoring ring points.

High-end target shooting diopters normally accept accessories like:
Rubber eye shields to restrain glare.
Anti-glare tubes.
Adjustable diopter aperture iris diaphragms (typically offering between  diameter apertures) to increase the depth of field and reduce reflections.
Optical filter systems to increase the contrast sensitivity for the aiming eye.
Semi-transparent occluders for the non-aiming eye to ensure optimal sighting conditions for match shooters.

Complementing front sight element
The complementing front sight element may be a simple (hooded) bead or post for service arms, but is for target shooting more often a globe type sight, which consists of a hollow cylinder with a threaded cap, which allows interchangeable differently shaped front sight elements to be used. Most common are posts of varying widths and heights or rings or holes of varying diameter — these can be chosen by the shooter for the best fit to the target being used. Tinted transparent plastic insert elements may also be used, with a hole in the middle; these work the same way as an opaque ring, but provide a less obstructed view of the target. High end target front sight tunnels normally also accept accessories like adjustable aperture and optical systems to ensure optimal sighting conditions for match shooters. Some high end target sight line manufacturers also offer front sights with integrated aperture mechanisms.

Diopter and globe sighting line principle

The use of round rear and front sighting elements for aiming at round targets, like used in ISSF match shooting, takes advantage of the natural ability of the eye and brain to easily align concentric circles (circles all having a common centre).

For optimal aiming and comfort the shooter should focus the aiming eye on the front sighting element. To avoid eye fatigue and improve balance the non-aiming eye should be kept open. The non-aiming eye can be blocked from seeing distractions by mounting a semi-transparent occluder to the diopter.

For maximum precision, there should still be a significant area of white visible around the bullseye and between the front and rear sight ring (if a front ring is being used). Since the best key to determining center is the amount of light passing through the apertures, a narrow, dim ring of light can actually be more difficult to work with than a larger, brighter ring.

The precise sizes of the employed components are quite subjective, and depend on both shooter preference and ambient lighting, which is why target rifles come with easily replaceable front sight inserts, and adjustable aperture mechanisms.

Gallery

References

External links
 Head Position, Diopter Interval and Lint by Heinz Reinkemeier, UIT Journal at www.issf-sports.org

Firearm components
Firearm sights